The California Building Industry Association (CBIA) is a state trade association in the United States. Headquartered in Sacramento, CA, the CBIA's mission is to advocate on behalf of the housing and the building industry.

The organization represents the interests of builders and developers of housing and commercial projects. The association supports state policies that eliminate or simplify building and environmental regulations in order to reduce construction costs.

Robert Rivinius is the current President and CEO of the organization.

History
The CBIA was established in 1943 as a federation of local and regional associations representing builders at the state level and functioned solely as a lobbying organization. In 1952, the organization incorporated as the California Home Builders Council. In 1968, the organization changed its name to the California Builders Council. In 1977, the organization became a full-service state level association. In 1978, the organization changed its name to the California Building Industry Association. There are now 10 regional affiliates.

Since 1977, a political action committee (PAC) and two subsidiary organizations have been established. The Building Industry Institute was created in 1994 and is involved in researching strategies to benefit the building industry. The California Homebuilding Foundation is an educational foundation that promotes the continued education of individuals and organizations interested in the building industry. The CHF also funds research to benefit the building industry. In addition to lobbying, the CBIA has incorporated technical, membership, insurance, and educational departments.

The CBIA sponsors the Pacific Coast Builders Conference, a regional building conference and trade show  which draws thousands of attendees and exhibitors each year.

Press
In 2008, the CBIA ended a consulting agreement with Alan Nevin, a San Diego economist.

In 2010, the CBIA objected to a proposed Los Angeles law that would require new homes, larger developments, and some redevelopment projects to prevent stormwater runoff from reaching the ocean. According to the Los Angeles Times, "The law was designed to mitigate the negative effects of urbanization by controlling runoff at its source with small, cost-effective natural systems instead of treatment facilities. Reducing runoff improves water quality and recharges groundwater...Under the ordinance, builders would be required to use rainwater storage tanks, permeable pavement, infiltration swales or curb bump-outs to manage the water where it falls. Builders unable to manage 100% of a project's runoff on site would be required to pay a penalty of $13 a gallon of runoff not handled there -- a requirement the Building Industry Assn. has been fighting."

See also
Building Industry Association of Southern California, Orange County Chapter

References

Trade associations based in the United States
1943 establishments in California
Organizations based in California